Joseph jojo Ogunnupe (born February 23, 1992 in Abuja) is a Nigerian football player, currently playing for Pembroke Athleta F.C. in the Maltese Challenge League.

Career
Ogunnupe began his career with Abuja-based New Academy Football and signed in January 2009 with FK Ventspils. After half year he left FK Ventspils in summer on loan to their farm team FC Tranzīts. After a good season Ogunnupe left FK Ventspils and was signed on a permanent basis by FC Tranzīts in March 2010. In December 2012 he moved to Malta to sign with Valletta F.C. in Malta he played for various clubs like Gzira United, St Georges and vittorriosa F.C.

Club career statistics

References

Living people
Nigerian footballers
1992 births
FK Ventspils players
FC Tranzīts players
Valletta F.C. players
Nigerian expatriate footballers
Expatriate footballers in Latvia
Nigerian expatriate sportspeople in Latvia
Expatriate footballers in Malta
Nigerian expatriate sportspeople in Malta
Yoruba sportspeople
Association football forwards